Tinies Childcare is a childcare company in the United Kingdom. It was acquired by brothers Ben and Oliver Black in March 2000. In August of that year they were joined by Amanda Coxen.  When started out in 1975, Tinies was a nanny agency with 5 branches around the country. Today Tinies is a childcare recruitment company with over 30 childcare & nanny agencies in the UK.

Tinies specialises in the recruitment of nannies and nursery staff, and the provision of fixed and mobile crèches.

In 2007 Tinies secured its first government Sure Start contract. Tinies now manages the holiday playschemes for over 32 government departments.

On behalf of fitness chains and corporate companies Tinies manages a chain of 25+ fixed creches & junior/kids club programmes. Tinies also run the overseas recruitment schemes for the leading UK holiday company Thomson Holidays.

Ben Black went on to found a web-based emergency childcare service, which went on to become the award-winning family friendly employee benefits company My Family Care (who also own Nannyshare.co.uk).

References

External links
Tinies website

Child care companies
Companies based in the London Borough of Hammersmith and Fulham